Zhao Lingxi (born 7 January 2000) is a Chinese junior tennis player.

Zhao has a career high ATP singles ranking of 1087 achieved on 27 August 2018.

On the junior tour Zhao has a career high ranking of 24 achieved on 30 January 2017. Zhao won the 2017 Australian Open boys' doubles championships alongside Hsu Yu-hsiou.

Junior Grand Slam finals

Doubles: 1 (1 title)

External links

2000 births
Living people
Chinese male tennis players
Australian Open (tennis) junior champions
Tennis players from Tianjin
Grand Slam (tennis) champions in boys' doubles